Carmencita Hederman (born 23 October 1939) is a former Independent Irish politician. She served on Dublin City Council from 1974 to 1999.

She was the daughter of George Cruess Callaghan and sister of Frank Cruess Callaghan, both successful businessmen as well as the niece of Joseph Cruess Callaghan. She was Lord Mayor of Dublin from 1987 to 1988 during the Dublin Millennium celebrations. She was elected to the Seanad in 1989 for the Dublin University constituency.

Family
Her husband was William Hederman (from 1962 until his death on 30 December 2016). A third-generation doctor and surgeon, Billy Hederman—son of William, a general practitioner on the staff of Limerick County Hospital in Croom and Ethel (née Hannigan) Hederman—was president of the Royal College of Surgeons in Ireland from 1990 to 1992 and later president of the Vascular Society of Great Britain and Ireland.

Her daughter, Wendy Hederman, was also later councillor on Dublin City Council, representing the Progressive Democrats.

References

1939 births
Living people
Independent politicians in Ireland
Members of the 19th Seanad
20th-century women members of Seanad Éireann
Lord Mayors of Dublin
Women mayors of places in Ireland
Members of Seanad Éireann for Dublin University
Independent members of Seanad Éireann